The following articles contain lists of number-one hits:

 List of Billboard number-one singles
 Lists of UK Singles Chart number ones
 List of number-one singles in Australia
 List of number-one singles in Canada
 List of number-one singles in France
 List of number-one hits (Germany)
 List of songs that reached number one on the Irish Singles Chart
 List of number-one hits (Italy)
 List of number-one songs in Norway
 List of number-one hits (Spain)
 European Hot 100 Singles
 Recorded Music NZ
 List of number-one singles in Switzerland
 List of number-one singles in the Dutch Top 40
 List of number-one singles and albums in Sweden
 List of number-one singles (Finland)
 List of number-one hits (Belgium)
 List of number-one hits (Denmark)
 List of number-one singles (Austria)
 Scottish Singles and Albums Charts
 List of number-one songs (Slovakia)
 List of number-one songs (Czech Republic)
 List of Oricon number-one singles
 List of number-one singles in Poland
 List of number-one singles (Romania)

Other 
 Lists of UK Dance Singles Chart number ones
 List of Billboard number-one alternative hits
 List of Billboard number-one dance hits
 Lists of number-one Billboard Hot Latin Songs
 List of Billboard number-one rhythm and blues hits

See also 
 Lists of number-one albums